Laeviomeliola is a genus of fungi within the Meliolaceae family.

References

External links

Sordariomycetes genera
Meliolaceae